St. Francis by-the-Sea American Catholic Church (St. Francis Cathedral Chapel; American Catholic Church) is a historic church in Laguna Beach, California, United States.  It was built in 1934 and was added to the National Register of Historic Places in 1988. It now houses the National Sick Call Set Museum.

It was designed by English-born Percy Wise Clarkson (1875-1942), who was also the founder and first bishop of the church.  He was an Episcopal priest but left the priesthood in 1928.  He became a bishop in the American Catholic Church in 1933.

He also built the first Episcopal church in Laguna Beach, a small chapel which served as a summer chapel in the 1920s, also named St. Francis by-the-Sea.

See also
National Register of Historic Places listings in Orange County, California

References

External links
Church website

Churches in Orange County, California
National Register of Historic Places in Orange County, California
Properties of religious function on the National Register of Historic Places in California
Churches completed in 1934
Romanesque Revival church buildings in California
Old Catholic church buildings in the United States
1934 establishments in California